Dress to Kill is the second and final Japanese album of South Korean girl group After School, released on March 19, 2014 in Japan under Avex Trax. The album was released in three versions, a CD & DVD Limited Press Edition, a CD Edition (mu-mo Version) and a regular CD Edition. It was preceded by the singles "Heaven" and "Shh".

It was the last album released by After School before going on an indefinite hiatus.

Editions
The album was released in three different editions: CD & DVD Limited Press Edition, CD Edition (mu-mo Version), and the Regular CD Edition.

The CD & DVD Limited Press Edition contains the CD album, and a DVD containing the music video for Heaven, two music videos for Shh (the regular music video and a Dance edit music video) and group performances from "Play Girlz Japan FAN MEETING 2013-WELCOME BACK!!AFTERSCHOOL-at Shinkiba Studio Coast" show including Diva, Flashback, Heaven, Crazy Driver and Slow Love.

The Regular CD Edition of "Dress to Kill" contains only the album itself along with a Japanese Version of "Flashback" as a bonus track.

The CD Edition (mu-mo Version) of "Dress to Kill" contains only the album itself along with a previously unreleased song titled "Lucky Girl" as a bonus track.

Track listing

Chart performance
In its first week, Dress to Kill charted at #33 with 4,252 copies sold, a large dip from the sales of their first album.

Oricon chart

Other charts

Release history

References 

2014 albums
Japanese-language albums
Avex Group albums
After School (band) albums
Hybe Corporation albums